The 1901 Cleveland Blues season was a season in American baseball. It was the franchise's first in the majors, being one of the original franchises of the American League. Called the "Blues" or "Bluebirds", the team finished seventh out of eight teams.

Before the 1901 season

1899: Major League Baseball leaves Cleveland 

The Cleveland Spiders were dissolved after winning only 20 games and losing 134 in the 1899 season along with the Louisville Colonels, Baltimore Orioles, and the Washington Senators, leaving the National League with eight teams to begin the 1900 season. As a result, 1900 marked the first year since 1886 during which the city of Cleveland did not have a team affiliated with Major League Baseball.

1900: A new franchise 
Ban Johnson, president of the Western League, changed the league's name to the American League in 1900, bringing aboard a new team in Cleveland, then known as the Cleveland Lake Shores, along with new Baltimore and Washington franchises, which would be created with or without the approval of the National League. During this time, Cleveland had a minor league baseball team, known as the Bluebirds or Blues due to their all-blue uniforms, which finished their season with a 63–73 record and finished sixth.

1901: Major league once more 
The American League became a major league before the 1901 season. As the American League made the jump to major league status, many players jumped ship, including Cy Young and Nap Lajoie, which led the National League to call them an "outlaw league" in November 1900. As the 1901 season came underway in April, and as the war between the two leagues erupted, the Cleveland franchise, now known as the Blues, began its first official season as a Major League Baseball team.

Regular season

Season summary

April

The Cleveland Blues played their first game of the season against the Chicago White Stockings on April 24, 1901. This was the first games in the history of the American League; three other games scheduled that day were rained out. The starting lineup consisted of: Ollie Pickering (RF), Jack McCarthy (LF), Frank Genins (CF), Candy LaChance (1B), Bill Bradley (3B), Erve Beck (2B), Bill Hallman (SS), Bob Wood (C), and Bill Hoffer (P). Hoffer allowed seven runs in the first two innings and the Blues failed to recover, as they lost the game 8–2, earning the first loss in American League history. In the second game of the season, Beck hit the first home run in American League history off pitcher John Skopec, but the Blues lost again, 7–3.

May

On May 9, 1901, Earl Moore threw the first no-hitter in the history of the franchise and the American League. The Blues lost to Chicago by a score of 4–2 despite allowing no hits.

On May 23, Cleveland scored nine runs with the bases empty and two outs in the bottom of the ninth inning to beat Washington 14–13.

Season standings

Record vs. opponents

Roster

Player stats

Key

Batting

Starters by position
Note: Pos = Position; G = Games played; AB = At bats; R = Runs; H = Hits; 2B = Doubles; 3B = Triples; Avg. = Batting average; HR = Home runs; RBI = Runs batted in; SB = Stolen bases

Other batters
Note: G = Games played; AB = At bats; R = Runs; H = Hits; 2B = Doubles; 3B = Triples; Avg. = Batting average; HR = Home runs; RBI = Runs batted in; SB = Stolen bases

Note: pitchers' batting statistics not included

Pitching

Starting pitchers
Note: G = Games pitched; GS = Games started; IP = Innings pitched; W = Wins; L = Losses; ERA = Earned run average; R = Runs allowed; ER = Earned runs allowed; BB = Walks SO = Strikeouts

Other pitchers
Note: W = Wins; L = Losses; ERA = Earned run average; G = Games pitched; GS = Games started; SV = Saves; IP = Innings pitched; R = Runs allowed; ER = Earned runs allowed; BB = Walks SO = Strikeouts

Relief pitchers
Note: G = Games pitched; GS = Games started; W = Wins; L = Losses; SV = Saves; ERA = Earned run average; IP = Innings pitched; R = Runs allowed; ER = Earned runs allowed; BB = Walks SO = Strikeouts

Awards and honors

League top five finishers 
Ollie Pickering
 #5 in AL in stolen bases (36)
 #5 in AL in singles (138)

Notes

References
1901 Cleveland Blues season at Baseball Reference

Cleveland Guardians seasons
Cleveland Bluebirds season
1901 in sports in Ohio